Aphanocapsa elachista is a species of Cyanobacteria belonging to the family Merismopediaceae.

Synonyms:
 Microcystis pulverea f. elachista (West & G.S.West) Elenkin 1938
 Microcystis elachista (West & G.S.West) Starmach 1966
 Aphanocapsa elachista var. planctonica G.M.Smith 1920

References

Cyanobacteria
Bacteria described in 1894